Donalsonville Municipal Airport is an airport located 2 miles south of Donalsonville, Georgia, United States.

History 
Opened in July 1944, during World War II, the airport was used as an auxiliary training airfield for the Army pilot school at Bainbridge Army Airfield.   With the end of the war,  it was turned over to the city of Donalsonville and developed into a municipal airport.

See also

 Georgia World War II Army Airfields

References 

 WWII Airfield Database - Georgia

External links 
 
 

Airfields of the United States Army Air Forces in Georgia (U.S. state)
Airports in Georgia (U.S. state)
1944 establishments in Georgia (U.S. state)